Bahalike railway station is located in Punjab, Pakistan.

See also
 List of railway stations in Pakistan
 Pakistan Railways

References

External links
Photograph of Bahalike railway station on Panoramio

Railway stations in Sheikhupura District
Railway stations on Shahdara Bagh–Sangla Hill Branch Line